The Hvalfjörður Tunnel is a road tunnel under the Hvalfjörður fjord in Iceland and a part of Route 1. Passing the fjord now takes 7 minutes instead of about an hour.

The tunnel was constructed by the company Spölur, while the Verkís company handled almost all of the design. Spölur was also the owner and operator of the tunnel until 2018, when ownership and administration of the tunnel were transferred as planned to the Icelandic Road Administration (Vegagerðin). This project was a milestone in Icelandic construction as it was the first private finance initiative without direct funding by the state treasury.

Construction
The construction of the tunnel was started in 1996, and completed in 1998 at a cost of about ISK 5,000 million (USD 70 million). The tunnel was designed for annual average daily traffic of 5,000 vehicles.

Tolls
The tunnel is toll free as of 28 September 2018, the date when the tunnel was turned over from the private operator Spölur to the Icelandic Road Administration (Vegagerðin). Motorcycles and larger vehicles paid different tolls. Pedestrians and cyclists are not permitted. The money went to pay for the construction of the tunnel by Spölur.

The original plan assumed it would take 20 years (until 2018) to pay back the cost of building the tunnel, but the traffic volume has proved to be significantly higher than originally projected. The volume of traffic is so high that the operator of the tunnel has suggested building a new tunnel alongside the current one because traffic is reaching the threshold mandated by a European regulation (8,000 vehicles daily) over which traffic in opposing directions should be separated.

Safety issues
The Hvalfjörður Tunnel received a bad rating in the 2010 European tunnel test, which is carried out annually by the German automobile club ADAC. 
Different aspects were criticized and are also mentioned in the EuroTAP test (see external links), especially the weak lighting, absence of an automatic fire alarm system, too weak ventilation in case of a fire and distance to the next fire station.

Between 2007 and 2013, several improvements to the tunnel's security were made, according to the newspaper Morgunblaðið resulting in a doubling of the tunnel's security level. The improvements included better lighting, setting up a monitoring system, new emergency lights and more fire extinguishers.

Images

See also
List of tunnels in Iceland

References

External links
2010 test results of Hvalfjörður Tunnel by EuroTAP (European Tunnel Assessment Programme)
Hvalfjörður Tunnel Transportation and Planning by Verkís

Road tunnels in Iceland
Undersea tunnels in Europe
Tunnels completed in 1998
1998 establishments in Iceland